Killebrew is a surname.  Notable people with the surname include:

Emrys Killebrew, a fictional character that appears in comic books published by Marvel Comics as a supporting character of the Deadpool
Flavius C. Killebrew (born 1949), President of Texas A&M University–Corpus Christi
Gwendolyn Killebrew (1941–2021), American contralto
Harmon Killebrew (1936–2011), American baseball player
Joseph Buckner Killebrew (1831–1906), American farmer
Miles Killebrew (born 1993), American football player
Robert Killebrew (born 1984), American and Canadian football linebacker